Helle Frederiksen (born 5 March 1981 in Odense, Funen) is a Danish professional triathlete. She represented Denmark in triathlon at the 2012 Summer Olympics, placing 27th, and raced on International Triathlon Union race circuit. She is the winner of the 2018 ITU Long Distance Triathlon World Championships as well as the 2014 Hy-Vee Triathlon and 2014 Challenge Bahrain.

Career 
Frederiksen was a swimmer from the age of 12 to 18 and a member of the national Danish swimming squad. She had won several Danish championships when, in 1999, she decided to retire from elite sports.

Frederiksen studied at Syddansk Universitet an earned a bachelor's degree in sports (Idræt og Sundhed, 2005) and after having moved to Farum she studied for a master's degree in Physical Education and Nutrition (Cand. Scient. i Human Ernæring, 2008) at the University of Copenhagen.

Having worked as a spinning trainer for five years, she missed her former life as an elite sportswoman and in 2004 she took part in, and won, a women's triathlon (Piger med Power) in Odense, and in 2005, at the Danish Championships, she placed second in the Sprint and third in the Olympic Distance. In 2006, an intensive training period on the Gold Coast in Australia was worth the effort, and Frederiksen won the Danish Championships at the Olympic Distance. For 4 consecutive years, from 2006 to 2009, she was the Danish Triathlon Champion. In 2010, however, due to a flat tyre in the bike stage, she could not finish the National Championships in Nykøbing Falster.

In 2010, Frederiksen suffered a mixture of misfortunes. Since her bicycle crash at the World Championship Series event in Madrid, she suffered from a hip and back injury and later a spinal disc prolapse dating back to 2007 started to cause pains again. On the other hand, Helle Frederiksen was awarded an Olympic Scholarship for Athletes London 2012 and competed at the 2012 Olympic Games, finishing in 27th place.

ITU competitions 

In the five years from 2006 to 2010, Helle Frederiksen took part in 36 ITU competitions and achieved 18 top ten positions, among which 10 medals.

DNS = did not start · DNF = did not finish

Personal life
Helle Frederiksen and the Welsh triathlete Ben Powell, former member of the Swansea High Performance Squad and son of the former Welsh Ironman record holder Martin Powell, are a couple. Ben Powell works at the triathlon high performance centre Club LaSanta in Lanzarote where Helle Frederiksen spends her training period.

References

External links 

 Frederiksen's ITU profile page
 Frederiksen's Homepage 
 Frederiksen's Tracktime Homepage  in Danish
 Danish Triathlon federation (Danske Triathlon Forbund) in Danish

Danish female triathletes
1981 births
Living people
Triathletes at the 2012 Summer Olympics
Olympic triathletes of Denmark
Sportspeople from Odense
20th-century Danish women
21st-century Danish women